Michael Bailey (born 14 October 1948 in the United Kingdom) was the chief executive officer of the Compass Group, a British food service company in the FTSE 100 Index. He stepped down on 31 May 2006.

Background
Michael Bailey joined the Compass Group in 1993 as a Group Development Director. He became CEO of the business in July 1999. He stood down in 2006.

References

External links
 Compass Group PLC - Official site

Sources
 Compass Group PLC - Official site

British hospitality businesspeople
Compass Group people
Living people
1948 births